Har Mard Ka Dard is an Indian Hindi Sitcom that originally aired on Life OK from February 14, 2017, to July 14, 2017. The series is produced by DJ's a Creative Unit of Tony Singh and Deeya Singh and directed by Parmeet Sethi.

Cast
 Faisal Rashid as Vinod Khanna
 Jinal Belani as Sonu Tanna Khanna
 Vaishali Thakkar as Vinod's Mother
 Karan Singh Chhabra as Monty Singh
 Prabhjeet Kaur as Vinod's Sister/Kannu
 Anita Kanwal as Vinod's Grandmother
 Mansi Multani as Pari
 Monica Castelino as Malika/Sonu's Friend/Sonu's neighbour
Suresh Kumar Rana
Munish Kumar
• Pragya Sethi as Bunty

Akash makhija - Dj bunnu

References

2017 Indian television series debuts
2017 Indian television series endings
Hindi-language television shows
Indian television soap operas
Indian comedy television series
Television shows set in Mumbai
Life OK original programming